Niña Mimada is a Venezuelan telenovela written by Valentina Párraga and produced by Radio Caracas Televisión in 1998. This telenovela lasted 112 episodes and was distributed internationally by RCTV International.

Eileen Abad and Marcelo Cezán starred as the main protagonists with Carlos Cámara Jr. and Scarlet Ortiz as the antagonists.

Synopsis
Patricia Echegaray is a pampered child, who is forced to marry a ruthless business man in order to save her family’s fortune. She escapes and then meets Angel, a handsome and simple man, who teaches Patricia to appreciate every single thing of nature and life. But for Angel and Patricia the road to happiness will be paved with sinister secrets, limitless greed, and a hidden past.

Cast
Jean Carlo Simancas as Aurelio Echegaray
Carlos Cámara Jr. as Joaquin Iriarte
Marcelo Cezan as Angel Custodio
Eileen Abad as Patricia Echegaray
Alba Roversi as Natalia Jorda
Sebastián Falco as Idrogo
Scarlet Ortiz as Federica 
Dora Mazzone as Rosalia
Ricardo Álamo as José 'Cheo' Mogollon
Sheyene Gerardi as La Araña
Virginia Lancaster as Cecilia Echegaray 
Eliana Lopez as Eme Eme
Guillermo Perez as Vladimir Mogollon
Francis Rueda as Margarita Mogollon
Alejandra Salomon as Afrodita del Carmen

References

External links
Niña Mimada at the Internet Movie Database
Opening Credits

1998 telenovelas
RCTV telenovelas
Venezuelan telenovelas
1998 Venezuelan television series debuts
1998 Venezuelan television series endings
Spanish-language telenovelas
Television shows set in Venezuela